Mohd Remezey bin Che Ros (born 1982 at Kuantan) is a Malaysian footballer currently playing for Pahang FA in Malaysia Super League.

External links

1982 births
Living people
People from Perak
People from Ipoh
Malaysian footballers
PDRM FA players
Sri Pahang FC players
Kuala Lumpur City F.C. players
PKNS F.C. players
Penang F.C. players
Malaysia Super League players
Association football goalkeepers